Patrick Green may refer to:
Patrick Green (politician) (born 1964), American politician
Patrick Green (VC), Irish VC recipient
Pat Green, American musician
Patrick Green, producer of the film Three Wishes
Paddy Green, owner of Evans Music-and-Supper Rooms
Charles Patrick Green, World War II RAF pilot

See also
Patrick Greene (disambiguation)